Kelsey Creek is a rural locality in the Whitsunday Region, Queensland, Australia. In the  Kelsey Creek had a population of 123 people.

History 
Kelsey Creek Provisional School opened on 30 January 1895. On 1 January 1909, it became Kelsey Creek State School. It closed in 1963.

References 

Whitsunday Region
Localities in Queensland